Malew and Santon was a House of Keys constituency in the Isle of Man. The constituency was created in 1986. It elected one MHK and the constituency covered the parishes of Malew and Santon. This was slightly unusual since Malew and Santon are in different sheadings. The constituency was abolished in 2016.

MHKs & Elections

References

External links
Constituency maps and general election results

Constituencies of the Isle of Man